Thomas Dunne Books was  an imprint of St. Martin's Press, which is a division of Macmillan Publishers. From 1986 until April 2020, it published popular trade fiction and nonfiction.

History
The imprint signed David Irving, a scholar, for a Joseph Goebbels biography in 1996 but had to drop the book when it was found out that Irving was a Holocaust denier for having links to Institute for Historical Review, "the literary center of the United States Holocaust-denial movement."

In October 1999, St. Martin's Press recalled a Dunne book, Fortunate Son: George W. Bush and the Making of an American President, and destroyed them after various incidents about the author, J. H. Hatfield, surfaced.  The incidents were that he had served prison time for a car-bombing attempt on his former boss's life and that he included an anonymous accusation about Bush.  A St. Martin's executive editor resigned in protest over the publication. In November, Dunne editors stopped attending St. Martin editorial meetings and started their own.

In June 2016, PublishersLunch announced that Thomas Dunne Books had been downsized to four employees.

In April 2020, St. Martin's Press eliminated the imprint as part of "implementing a job reduction action and hiring freeze" due to economic struggles caused by the COVID-19 pandemic.

Authors
 Jesse Slattery The Juliet Effect Library of Congress Cataloging-in-Publication Data: Slattery, Jesse. The Juliet Effect. 1. Title. PS3569.L.266J85  1987  813'.54  87-16142  ISBN 0-312-01053-2
 James MacGregor Burns
 J.P. Donleavy
 Jeff Hertzberg and Zoë François 
 Joe Haldeman (The Forever War)
 Bobby Knight
 Ralph Nader
 Paul Beatty
 Michael Palin and the members of Monty Python
 Frederik Pohl
 Judd Trichter
 Bernie Sanders (Our Revolution: A Future to Believe In)
 William Shatner
 Jincy Willett
 David Wong (John Dies at the End)
 Viv Albertine
 John Hart (author)
 Steve Hamilton (author)

Macmillan Entertainment 
Macmillan Films (MF) was launched by Thomas Dunne Books in October 2010. It produced the docudrama series Gangland Undercover based on the book Vagos, Mongols, and Outlaws: My Infiltration of America's Deadliest Biker Gangs, by Charles Falco and Kerrie Droban, which the imprint published in 2013.

Macmillan Films was renamed Macmillan Entertainment. As of April 2020, the division's web site listed no staff, products in development, or available properties.

References

External links
 

St. Martin's Press
Publishing companies established in 1986
1986 establishments in New York City
American companies established in 1986